This is a list of Belgian football transfers for the 2008-09 winter transfer window. Only transfers involving a team from the Jupiler League are listed.

The winter transfer window opened on 1 January 2009, although a few transfers may have taken place prior to that date. The window closed at midnight on 31 January 2009.

Sorted by date

October 2008

November 2008

December 2008

January 2009

February 2009

Sorted by team

Anderlecht

In:

Out:

Cercle Brugge

In:

Out:

Charleroi

In:

Out:

Club Brugge

In:

Out:

Dender

In:

Out:

Genk

In:

Out:

Gent

In:

Out:

Germinal Beerschot

In:

Out:

Kortrijk

In:

Out:

Lokeren

In:

Out:

Mechelen

In:

Out:

Mons

In:

Out:

Mouscron

In:

Out:

Roeselare

In:

Out:

Standard Liège

In:

Out:

Tubize

In:

Out:

Westerlo

In:

Out:

Zulte Waregem

In:

Out:

References

Transfers Winter
Belgian
2008 Winter